Sosthenes (Greek Σωσθένης; died 277 BC) was a Macedonian general who may have been a king of the Antipatrid dynasty. During the reign of Lysimachus he was his governor in Asia Minor. Sosthenes was elected King by the Macedonian army, but he may or not have reigned as king. Appointed as strategos he may have declined the title of king as he had no royal connections. During his reign he faced invading Galatians, Antigonus II Gonatas and other rivals. He defeated Bolgius, one of the earliest invading Galatian leaders but was soon faced with the invasion of Brennus in the summer of 279 BC. Antigonus II Gonatas tried to invade Macedonia from Asia in 278 but was beaten by Sosthenes.

Citations

References
 

277 BC deaths
3rd-century BC Macedonian monarchs
Ancient Macedonian monarchs
3rd-century BC rulers
Murdered royalty of Macedonia (ancient kingdom)
Antipatrid Macedonia
Year of birth unknown